Courts of Judicial Magistrate of First Class are at the  second lowest level of the Criminal Court structure in India. According to the Section 11 of the Criminal Procedure Code, 1973 (CrPc), a Court of Judicial Magistrate of First Class may be established by the State Government in consultation with the High Court of the respective state at such places in the district and in any number by a notification. 

According to Section 15 of the CrPc, a judicial magistrate is under the general control of the Sessions Judge and is subordinate to the Chief Judicial Magistrate. 

According to Section 29 of the CrPc., a Judicial Magistrate of First Class may pass a sentence of imprisonment for a term not exceeding three years, or of fine not exceeding ten thousand rupees or of both.

See also 
Courts of Metropolitan Magistrate - Have the same powers as of Judicial Magistrate of First Class in India
 Chief Judicial Magistrate Court

References

Judiciary of India